Show Me the Money is a television game show hosted by William Shatner which ran on ABC from November 14, 2006 to December 13, 2006. The show employed an aspect similar to Deal or No Deal, but with open-ended trivia questions.

The show was taped at CBS Television City in Hollywood. It also aired in Canada on CH.

Game play
Before the game, scrolls were randomly distributed to thirteen female dancers known as the $1,000,000 Dancers. Twelve of the scrolls contained various dollar amounts, while one held a "killer card" symbolized by a black dancer silhouette within a yellow triangle. The dollar amounts were:

Each turn involved a set of three concealed questions (A, B, and C) with a common initial word or phrase. The player was shown this initial phrase, then chose one of the three options. The question was read, and the player could either answer it or pass and pick another letter. Passed questions were permanently removed from play; a player could pass twice on the same turn, but was then required to answer the third question. The player gave an answer and selected one dancer to open her scroll, after which the correct answer was revealed. If the scroll showed a dollar amount, it was added to the player's s bank for a correct answer or deducted for a miss. Negative bank totals were possible. The chosen dancer and her scroll were removed from play after each question.

Once the player had given either six correct answers or six incorrect ones on questions with money at stake, the game ended and the player won all the money in the bank. If the pot fell so far below zero that it would be mathematically impossible to achieve a positive total, the game ended immediately and the player left with nothing, but was offered a last dance with the host and the dancers.

The maximum possible winnings total was $1,150,000, achieved by selecting only the six highest dollar amounts and correctly answering a question associated with each.

Killer Card
If the killer card was revealed, the current question was discarded and a new "sudden-death" question was asked, with no option to pass. An incorrect answer ended the game immediately and eliminated the player with no winnings. If the player did respond correctly, the game continued as normal, but the answer was not counted toward the six needed to end the game and the bank was not affected.

On the premiere episode only, the player was allowed to answer the current question after finding the killer card. The game continued normally on a correct answer, while a miss triggered the sudden-death situation described above.

Broadcast history
The show premiered on November 14, 2006 in the Tuesday 8:00 p.m. timeslot, with one episode airing per week for the next five weeks. On December 8, 2006, after the first seven episodes had been taped, an additional six-episode order as well as a planned move to a Tuesday night timeslot starting on January 2, 2007 were announced, which would have brought the total number of episodes to 13.

Cancellation
On December 15, 2006, ABC canceled the series after five episodes due to continually declining ratings, leaving two of the seven episodes that were produced unaired. The show was replaced immediately with reruns of America's Funniest Home Videos. ABC had earlier decided to cease production of the series, but air the remaining episodes.

Three of the $1,000,000 dancers have since appeared on other shows:
 Julianne Hough began appearing as a professional dancer on Dancing with the Stars in 2007, she would leave that show in 2009 in order to focus on her acting career. 
 Yesenia Adame was the caller on the ABC version of National Bingo Night, which aired in the summer of 2007. 
 Eve Torres was the winner of World Wrestling Entertainment's 2007 diva search, and would work with the company for seven years before retiring as a professional wrestler in 2013.

GSN picked up the rights to the seven episodes of Show Me The Money in June 2007, which included the five that aired on ABC, plus the remaining two episodes that the network did not air.

The first episode aired on June 12, 2007 and the second episode aired on June 19, 2007. However, on June 26, 2007, GSN replaced the series with an episode of Who Wants to Be a Millionaire. It is known that GSN pulled the show due to bad ratings for the first two weeks and it was replaced by Dog Eat Dog on the Tuesday nights for the remainder of July 2007. There is no indication that GSN will air the show again, thus the two episodes not broadcast by ABC remain unaired.

(However, GSN's webpage for the show included a photo that appeared to be from an unaired episode. The carryover contestant from the last episode aired by ABC (Bob Glouberman) is shown with the amount of $890,000 displayed on the scoreboard, he finished the episode with $882,000 and was paid despite the fact that the show did not air.)

International versions

References

External links
  at the Wayback Machine
 
 William Shatner Set To Helm New Game Show
 TV Series Finale—Article On The Reasons For Cancellation

2006 American television series debuts
2006 American television series endings
2000s American game shows
American Broadcasting Company original programming
Television series by Endemol
English-language television shows